General elections were held in Ecuador on 3 June 1956. The presidential elections were won by Camilo Ponce Enríquez of the People's Alliance, a coalition of the Conservative Party, the Social Christian Party and Ecuadorian Nationalist Revolutionary Action. He defeated Raúl Clemente Huerta of the National Democratic Front (an alliance of the Ecuadorian Radical Liberal Party, the Socialist Party and the Communist Party) by 0.4% of the vote. He took office on 1 September.

Results

President

References

Elections in Ecuador
1956 in Ecuador
Ecuador
Election and referendum articles with incomplete results